Idalia Zagroba (born 1967) is a Polish printmaker.

Zagroba graduated from the Academy of Fine Arts, Krakow, in 1995. An untitled woodcut of 1995 is owned by the National Gallery of Art.

References

1967 births
Living people
20th-century printmakers
20th-century Polish women artists
21st-century printmakers
21st-century Polish women artists
Jan Matejko Academy of Fine Arts alumni
Polish printmakers
Women printmakers